Laterrière may refer to:

Persons with the surname 
 Pierre de Sales Laterrière (1747–1815), inspector and director of the Forges du Saint-Maurice and seigneur of Les Éboulements in New France (Canada)
 Pierre-Jean de Sales Laterrière (1789–1834), doctor and author
 Marc-Pascal de Sales Laterrière (1792–1872), doctor, seigneur and political figure

Places 
 Laterrière, Quebec, a sector of the Chicoutimi borough of the city of Saguenay, in Quebec, Canada
 Laterrière (Haïti), a rural establishment in the Chambellan commune of Arrondissement Jérémie in Grand'Anse department in Haïti